Haltdalen is a village in Holtålen municipality in Trøndelag county, Norway. The village of Haltdalen has approximately 600 inhabitants (2004). It is situated along the Rørosbanen railway line connecting the town of Røros and the village of Støren.

From 1838 until 1972, the village was the administrative centre of the old municipality of Haltdalen.  Haltdalen is known for the old Haltdalen Stave Church that was built in the 12th century. The original can be seen at the Trøndelag Folkemuseum at Sverresborg in Trondheim. In 2004, a copy of the old stave church was constructed on the grounds of the Haltdalen Church.  Also, a replica of the Haltdalen stave church was built in Heimaey in Vestmannaeyjar, Iceland as a gift from Norway to Iceland. 
Haltdalen-Røros-Brekken is home to the Haltdalen Training Center, which is used as a training camp for cold-weather warfare by Norwegian and American forces.

References

Villages in Trøndelag
Holtålen